La Chambre d'Echo – Where the Dead Birds Sing is the eighth album by darkwave band Sopor Aeternus & the Ensemble of Shadows, and was released in 2004. La Chambre d'Echo saw the return of synthesizers and drum machines, while still focusing on chamber music-inspired darkwave music. John A. Rivers returned to produce the album alongside Anna-Varney Cantodea. An accompanying EP, Flowers in Formaldehyde, was released later that year. The album was introduced and promoted via a promotional video.

Overview
La Chambre d'Echo was heavily inspired by Der Narrenturm, an old Austrian hospital and psychiatric ward that has since become a museum of diseases, mutations and abnormalities of the human body. As a result, the lyrical focus is that of hospitals and medical care in general. The album artwork, in part, features Cantodea transforming into a large worm-like creature, reminiscent of the artwork for Marilyn Manson's Antichrist Superstar.

The album featured prevalent use of synthesizers and drum machines, reflecting Sopor Aeternus' first album, Ich töte mich....

The packaging for La Chambre d'Echo is elaborate and extensive. The standard edition comes inside a 128-page, A4-sized book containing photography by Joachim Luetke, as well as handwritten lyrics provided by Cantodea. The photoshoot for the album was taken inside and around Der Narrenturm. The boxed set edition came in a linen-bound box and also included bookmarks, postcards, a translation guide and a pamphlet advertising Der Narrenturm; the included book was enclosed and sealed in an envelope. Curiously, the cover of the vinyl edition featured an image taken for the previous album, Es reiten die Toten so schnell (or "The Vampyre Sucking at His Own Vein'"). The vinyl edition features its own abridged version of the book as well as a poster. A postcard was included with the album, offering fans the chance to pre-order Flowers in Formaldehyde.

Track listing

Personnel
 Chris Wilson: Violin
 Susannah Simmons: Violin
 Liz Hanks: Cello
 Miriam Hughes: Flute
 Tonia Price: Clarinet
 Andrew Pettitt: Oboe
 Doreena Gor: Bassoon
 James Cunningham: Trumpet
 Tim Barber: Trumpet
 Julian Turner: Trombone
 Anthony Bartley: Tuba
 Paul Brook: Drums
 Anna-Varney Cantodea: Vocals, all other instruments and programming

References

2004 albums
Sopor Aeternus and The Ensemble of Shadows albums